The 1967 San Jose State Spartans football team represented San Jose State College during the 1967 NCAA University Division football season.

San Jose State played as an Independent in 1967. The team was led by third-year head coach Harry Anderson, and played home games at Spartan Stadium in San Jose, California. The Spartans finished the 1967 season with a record of two wins and seven losses (2–7). Overall, the team was outscored by its opponents 166–286 for the season.

Schedule

Team players in the NFL/AFL
The following San Jose State players were selected in the 1968 NFL Draft.

Notes

References

San Jose State
San Jose State Spartans football seasons
San Jose State Spartans football